Charles Race Thorson Mathews (born 27 March 1935) is an Australian co-operative economist, and former member of Victoria's State Parliament and Australia's Federal Parliament for the Australian Labor Party (ALP).  he was a senior research fellow at Monash University's Faculty of Business and Economics.

Career
Mathews joined the Labor Party in 1956 and served as chief of staff to Prime Minister Gough Whitlam and Labor leaders in the Parliament of Victoria before his election to the House of Repressentatives.

From 1972 to 1975, Mathews was the Federal Member for Casey, where he served as the chairman of the House of Representatives Select Committee on Specific Learning Difficulties (1974–1975), and the chairman of the Government Members' Committee on Urban and Regional Development. From 1979 to 1992, Mathews served as the State Member for Oakleigh in the Victorian Legislative Assembly during the Cain Government. In this capacity, Mathews served as the chairman of the Ministerial Advisory Committee on Co-operatives, the Minister for Community Services from 1987 to 1988, and Minister for Police and Emergency Services and Minister for the Arts 1982–1987. 

Mathews is the author, co-author, or editor of numerous books on politics and economics. These include Building the Society of Equals: Worker Co-operatives and the A.L.P., Jobs of Our Own, Australia's First Fabians,  Whitlam Re-visited: Policy Development, Policies and Outcomes, Labor's Troubled Times, Turning the Tide: Towards a Mutualist Philosophy and Politics for Labor and the Left and Of Labour and Liberty: Distributism in Victoria, 1891-1966.

In the context of co-operative economics, Mathews supports distributism and strongly favours worker cooperatives as the basis of a left-wing economic model.

Controversy
Mathews' Co-operative Individualism, coupled with his strong Fabian Socialist beliefs, has led to some criticism by other academics. For instance, Jocelyn Pixley has attacked Mathews for his (apparent) support of the Cain Government's Co-operative Development Program, on the basis that Beatrice Webb, a founder of the Fabian Society, was a prominent member of the Federalist school of Co-operative economics, which supports Consumers' Co-operatives linked through co-operative wholesale societies, and was a harsh critic of workers' cooperatives. Pixley writes:

A 'prefigurative' argument, that [Workers] co-ops were 'pioneers of a new exciting territory', a 'testing ground' for socialism... formed the basis of one Labor politician's support [i.e. Mathews], among others. It is an interesting position for a professed Fabian to hold, given Beatrice Webb's harsh judgement that [Workers'] co-operatives were associations of small capitalists as fraudulent as any other."

However, in spite of being a Minister in the Cain Government's Chairman of the Ministerial Advisory Committee on Co-operatives, and being a supporter of Workers Co-operatives, Mathews was a critic of the Cain Government's Co-operative Development Program, telling one magazine at the time that they were:

"... 'in most instances wretchedly managed, chronically under-performing and expressive of the attitude that the world owes their members a living.' He said that we should 'wipe what has already happened in this state in the field of co-operation.' It was 'an historical aberration,' and it 'would have been better if it had never been.'"

Personal life 
Mathews has been a member of science fiction fandom since the early 1950s. He attended his first science fiction convention in 1952, and was instrumental in the founding of the Melbourne Science Fiction Group. He mostly abandoned fannish activities, as political matters began to occupy more of his time around 1956. Since his retirement from active politics, he has returned to fannish circles.

Mathews was in a relationship with Ainsley Gotto, personal private secretary to Liberal Party leader John Gorton (prime minister from 1968 to 1971). Most of the media were aware of the relationship with Gotto but did not report on it. Mathews also told Whitlam, who tolerated the relationship on the proviso there was no "pillow talk".

Mathews later married Iola Hack, a journalist who co-founded the Women's Electoral Lobby and worked within the Australian Council of Trade Unions to achieve workplace gender equity in the 1980s and 1990s.

References

External links

 

1935 births
Living people
Australian socialists
Members of the Victorian Legislative Assembly
Australian Labor Party members of the Parliament of Victoria
Australian Labor Party members of the Parliament of Australia
Politicians from Melbourne
Members of the Australian House of Representatives for Casey
Academic staff of Monash University
Australian economists
20th-century Australian politicians
Distributism
People from Hawthorn, Victoria